Duncan Parsons (born 25 October 1971) is a British drummer and singer/songwriter. He grew up in the South of England, attending The Skinners' School in Tunbridge Wells.

Although his primary instrument is drums, he also plays guitar, bass, mandolin and keyboards, and is a sound engineer/producer.

He is also a programmer, working with GForce.

In the 1990s
Duncan's music career started with school and university bands. After having been drumming for a number of years, in 1993 he received some tuition from Bill Bruford.

His early recorded work was with Marc Catley, with whom he recorded three full albums, and a number of contributions to other albums between 1993 and 1996. Two of the albums (Hot Air For Jesus and No Tomorrow) were Christian satirical music, later combined into the release Char; the other (as Paley's Watch) was the progressive rock album November, released in 1994, featuring singer  Marianne Velvart.

Later in the 1990s Duncan worked with various artists, including film-maker Philip Clemo, Marianne Velvart's band, and folk singer Judith Silver.

Solo work
From the late 1990s through to the early 2010s, Duncan largely withdrew from public involvement with music, until the release of Abandoned Buildings in 2012, a collection of 18 tracks described as "a song cycle with an emotional arc telling of grace against a backdrop of falling in love and failing in love." This was followed by another, more progressive album C:Ore in 2014. Whilst Duncan plays the majority of the instruments on these albums, they also have featured guest appearances from John Hackett, Steve Hackett, Gary Boyle, Raul D'Oliveira, Ton Scherpenzeel, and Daughters Of Davis.

Alongside these larger scale releases, Parsons has also released two pseudo ambient albums under the banner Music for Stairlifts, Vol.1 and Vol.2: (Adapting Silent Films) For The Radio.

When performing live, Duncan normally sings accompanying himself on a nylon strung guitar (carrying on in the tradition of Marc Catley's Classical Acoustic Rock). He performs arrangements of his own works from solo albums, as well as songs by Supertramp, King Crimson, Family, Chaka Khan, Jethro Tull, The Moody Blues, and others.

Video
In support of Abandoned Buildings, Parsons drew an animated film to accompany the album. Ten of the eighteen album tracks were used in full (along with an instrumental excerpt from the track Answerphone) to create a 45-minute animated cartoon, following the same emotional arc as the album. A DVD was released, The Abandoned Buildings Cinema Show, shortly after the CD. This included a bonus feature of an additional animation for the instrumental track Tumblé d'Amour.

Further animation and video has followed for Music for Stairlifts and C:Ore of varying quality. Examples of his work are available on YouTube.

Production work
In 1995, Duncan produced a three song demo for Marianne Velvart. This generated interest from Rick Wakeman, leading to Marianne being signed to Wakeman's Hope label. The label folded before Marianne recorded a note.

As well as helping local Sheffield musicians with demos and album projects,  in 2011 Duncan started collaborating with John Hackett, aiding him with production on four albums released through his HackTrax label; two duet albums with classical guitarist Nick Fletcher, Overnight Snow and Hills Of Andalucia, and two of Nick's solo albums, A Moment Of Stars and Blue Horizon.

John Hackett Band
Following the release of John Hackett's Another Life, a trio was formed with John (guitars, keys, vocals), Nick Fletcher (lead guitar) and Duncan (percussion, vocals), which was soon expanded to a full band with the addition of Jeremy Richardson (bass, guitars, vocals) and Duncan moving to full drum kit.

The band started public performances as the John Hackett Band in 2016, their debut album We Are Not Alone was released in 2017 through Esoteric Antenna Records as a double CD set of a studio album and a live album recorded in 2016.

Discography

Solo
 2012 - Abandoned Buildings
 2013 - The Abandoned Buildings Cinema Show (animated DVD)
 2014 - C:Ore
 2014 - Music for Stairlifts (Vol.1)
 2016 - Music for Stairlifts (Vol.2): (Adapting Silent Films) For The Radio
 2020 - Common Sense Dancing
 2022 - On Earth, As It Is

With others
 1993 - Hot Air For Jesus (Marc Catley Band)
 1993 - The British Progressive Rock Directory (Volume 2) (Paley's Watch, single track, November, which did not feature on the subsequent album)
 1994 - No Tomorrow (Marc Catley And The Flaming Methodists)
 1994 - November (Paley's Watch)
 1994 - Mannerisms - A Celebration of the music of Geoff Mann (track Certainly by Marc Catley and Paley's Watch)
 1995 - Greenbelt 95 (sampler, one track each from  Marc Catley and Paley's Watch)
 1996 - Guat-a-Gig Live! (charity album, Caza Alianza Suite with Paley's Watch)
 1996 - Char (Marc Catley And The Flaming Methodists, a compilation of Hot Air For Jesus and No Tomorrow)
 1997 - Inhale The Colours (Sound)
 2015 - Another Life (John Hackett; triangle and additional sound engineering on track Satellite)
 2017 - We Are Not Alone (John Hackett Band)

Production
 2013 - Overnight Snow (John Hackett and Nick Fletcher)
 2014 - A Moment Of Stars (Nick Fletcher)
 2016 - Blue Horizon (Nick Fletcher)
 2016 - Hills Of Andalucia (John Hackett and Nick Fletcher)
 2017 - We Are Not Alone (John Hackett Band)
 2017 - Prog Alchymia (Playing The History) (sound engineering, percussion, keyboards, vocoder)
 2019 - The Journey Continues (Nick Fletcher) (final mix, mastering)

References

External links
Official Website

1971 births
Living people